Clare Lilley is a British art curator and Director at the Yorkshire Sculpture Park. She previously held the post of Director of Programme.

Lilley graduated with a degree in the History of Art from Manchester University. Since 2012 she has curated Frieze Sculpture in London's Regents Park and she has curated William Turnbull for Chatsworth House, Derbyshire and Jaume Plensa at San Giorgio Maggiore as Venice Biennale collateral event.

Lilley sits on the Advisory Committee of the Government Art Collection and the boards of Art UK, London, the George Rickey Foundation, New York and the Jupiter Artland Foundation, Edinburgh. She is a nominator for the Nasher Sculpture Prize and has been a judge for the Paul Hamlyn Foundation Visual Art Awards, the Kleinwort Hambros Emerging Artist Award and the Eden Project Pollinator Commission. She is the author of  Vitamin C: Clay and Ceramic in Contemporary Art, published by Phaidon.

Lilley has twice been cited on the Artylst Alt Power List.

References

External links
AN/Frieze Debate: Public Art; Who and What is it for? 16.10 2013
YOOX.Com channel: Video Interview with Clare Lilley, Frieze Sculpture Park, 2012

Year of birth missing (living people)
Living people
British art directors
English curators
British curators
British women curators